Lionel Cappone (born February 8, 1979) is a French former professional football player who played as a goalkeeper.

Born in Marignane, a suburb of Marseille, he began his career at his local club, Olympique de Marseille.  However, after several seasons without playing a single match, he joined Besançon RC, where he played every match in the 2002–03 Ligue 2 season.

Moving to another Ligue 2 club, Dijon FCO, he played just three matches in the 2003–04 season before moving to Angers SCO.

He moved to Ligue 1 club FC Lorient ahead of the 2006–07 season, where he was handed the number 1 shirt.

Cappone's debut for Lorient came on Saturday, October 28, 2006, when he was brought on 12 minutes into Lorient's match against Valenciennes FC to replace the injured Fabien Audard. However, it lasted all of 12 minutes; after taking down an opposing striker, he was sent off and had to be replaced by midfielder Ulrich Le Pen, who make a few very good saves in Lorient's 1–0 shutout victory.

In July 2011 signed a two-year contract with Stade Brestois.

References

External links
 
 

1979 births
Living people
French footballers
Association football goalkeepers
Ligue 1 players
Ligue 2 players
Olympique de Marseille players
Racing Besançon players
Dijon FCO players
Angers SCO players
FC Lorient players
Stade Brestois 29 players
Stade Lavallois players
French people of Italian descent